Saeed al-Shehabi (Arabic:سعيد الشهابي, born 1954) is a London-based Bahraini political activist, journalist, commentator and member of the Bahrain Freedom Movement

Shehabi earned his BSc and PhD (in Control Engineering) from the City University London.

According to the London-based Centre for the Study of Terrorism, of which he is Trustee, Shahabi edited the London-based Pan-Arabic weekly Al Aalam from 1983 to 1999 and, in addition to being Chairman of the Gulf Cultural Club, serves as a trustee of two Muslim charities located in London, the Dar Al-Hekma Trust and the Abrar Islamic Foundation, and writes "regularly" for Al-Quds and The Muslim News.

The BBC describes Shehabi as "leader of a Bahraini opposition group in London."

References

Living people
1954 births
Politics of Bahrain
Alumni of City, University of London